Cyclophora sublunata is a moth in the family Geometridae first described by Charles Swinhoe in 1904. It is found in Ghana and Ivory Coast.

References

Moths described in 1904
Cyclophora (moth)
Insects of West Africa
Moths of Africa